Captain Alexander Crawford Browne (died 11 December 1942) was an Ulster Unionist Party politician.

Crawford Browne attended Methodist College Belfast from 1873 to 1880. He served in the 36th (Ulster) Division from 1914 to 1919 and became a Captain in 1917. In 1924 he was elected as a Belfast City Councillor before becoming a councillor for Princeton Ward in Bangor in 1927. He was elected at the 1931 general election as Member of Parliament (MP) for Belfast West, and held the seat until his death.

In 1935, he married Dorothy Dawson. Dorothy was from a family of eight who also attended Methodist College Belfast.

His death triggered a by-election in February 1943, when the formerly safe Unionist seat was won by the Northern Ireland Labour Party candidate Jack Beattie.

References

External links 

Year of birth missing
1942 deaths
Ulster Unionist Party members of the House of Commons of the United Kingdom
Members of the Parliament of the United Kingdom for Belfast constituencies (since 1922)
UK MPs 1931–1935
UK MPs 1935–1945
People educated at Methodist College Belfast